Santa Maria Maddalena is a Baroque-style, Roman Catholic church located on Via Ricci #10 in Ravenna, region of Emilia Romagna, Italy.

The church was designed by Camaldolese monk Fausto Pellicciotti, and erected between 1748 and 1750, likely on the site of a church named Santa Maria in Luminibus or in Luminaria. The interior has altarpieces by Andrea Barbiani and his brother Domenico.

An inventory from 1835, also lists paintings by Domenico Corvi (Magdalen walks to Calvary) and Marcello Leopardi (Deposition at Calvary.

References

18th-century Roman Catholic church buildings in Italy
Roman Catholic churches completed in 1750
Roman Catholic churches in Ravenna
Baroque architecture in Ravenna